Kikaste is a village in Luunja Parish, Tartu County in eastern Estonia.

References

Villages in Tartu County
Kreis Dorpat